Domingo García Heredia (born 30 November 1904 - 19 December 1986 ) was a Peruvian football midfielder who played for Peru in the 1930 FIFA World Cup. He also played for Alianza Lima.

References

External links
FIFA profile

Peruvian footballers
Peru international footballers
Association football midfielders
Peruvian Primera División players
Club Alianza Lima footballers
1930 FIFA World Cup players
1986 deaths
1904 births